was a town located in Taka District, Hyōgo Prefecture, Japan.

As of 2003, the town had an estimated population of 11,662 and a density of 242.86 persons per km². The total area was 48.02 km².

On November 1, 2005, Naka, along with the towns of Kami and Yachiyo (all from Taka District), was merged to create the town of Taka.

External links
 Naka official website in Japanese (Archive)

Dissolved municipalities of Hyōgo Prefecture
Taka, Hyōgo